Uruguay competed at the 1972 Summer Olympics in Munich, West Germany. Thirteen competitors, ten men and three women, took part in twelve events in five sports.

Athletics

Men's Hammer Throw
Darwin Piñeyrúa

Women's 200 metres
Josefa Vicent

Women's 400 metres
Josefa Vicent

Boxing

Men's Flyweight (– 51 kg)
Jorge Acuña
 First Round — Lost to Leo Rwabwogo (UGA), 0:5

Cycling

Five cyclists represented Uruguay in 1972.

Individual road race
 Walter Tardáguila — 74th place
 Mario Mergaleff — did not finish (→ no ranking)
 Alberto Rodríguez — did not finish (→ no ranking)
 Jorge Jukich — did not finish (→ no ranking)

Team time trial
 Jorge Jukich
 Lino Benech
 Alberto Rodríguez
 Walter Tardáguila

Rowing

Men's Coxed Pairs
Pedro Ciapessoni, Jorge Buenahora and Daniel Jorge
Heat — 8:29.51
Repechage — 8:52.42 (→ did not advance)

Swimming

Women's 100m Freestyle
Susana Saxlund
 
Women's 100m Backstroke
Felicia Ospitaletche

Women's 200m Backstroke
Felicia Ospitaletche

Women's 100m Butterfly
Susana Saxlund

Women's 200m Individual Medley
Felicia Ospitaletche

References

External links
Montevideo.com
Official Olympic Reports

Nations at the 1972 Summer Olympics
1972 Summer Olympics
1972 in Uruguayan sport